The 2012–13 UNC Wilmington Seahawks men's basketball team represented the University of North Carolina Wilmington during the 2012–13 NCAA Division I men's basketball season. The Seahawks, led by third year head coach Buzz Peterson, played their home games at the Trask Coliseum and were members of the Colonial Athletic Association. Due to low APR scores, the Seahawks were ineligible for post season play, including the CAA Tournament. They finished the season 10–20, 5–13 in CAA play to finish in ninth place.

Roster

Schedule

|-
!colspan=9| Exhibition

|-
!colspan=9| Regular Season

References

UNC Wilmington Seahawks men's basketball seasons
UNC Wilmington